Stevonne Latrall Smith Sr. (born May 12, 1979) is an American former professional football player who was a wide receiver for sixteen seasons in the National Football League (NFL), primarily with the Carolina Panthers, also playing for the Baltimore Ravens. He played college football for the Utah Utes, and was drafted by the Panthers in the third round of the 2001 NFL Draft.

Smith, a five-time Pro Bowl selection and three-time All-Pro, emerged as one of the NFL's most productive wide receivers of the 21st century, leading the league in catches, receiving yards, and touchdowns in 2005. He played for the Panthers for thirteen seasons before signing with the Ravens in March 2014, and is the Panthers' all-time leader in total touchdowns (67), receptions (836) and receiving yards (12,197). In 2011, he became the 35th player in NFL history to amass 10,000 receiving yards. At the time of his retirement, he ranked seventh in NFL career all-purpose yards (19,180), seventh in NFL career receiving yards (14,731), twelfth in career receptions (1,031), and 25th in receiving touchdowns (81). Smith generated more than 1,000 all-purpose yards in eleven different seasons and at least 1,900 all-purpose yards in four of his first five seasons.

High school career
Smith attended University High School in Los Angeles, and was a letterman in football and track & field. In football, he played running back and defensive back, and was an All-Metro League selection as well as an All-California Interscholastic Federation selection. Smith graduated from University High School in 1997.

In track & field, he set a handful of school records, was named as an All-City selection as a high-hurdler, and also excelled in the triple jump and 300m hurdles. He had personal-bests of 14.95 seconds in the 110m hurdles and 38.73 seconds in the 300m hurdles.

College career
After graduating from high school, Smith attended Santa Monica College. While playing for the Santa Monica Corsairs football team, Smith quickly defined himself as a talented football player, and earned a starting position. During this time, Smith was teammates with future NFL wide receiver Chad Johnson, surprising fans of the small college team with their unexpected talents.

While impressing spectators with his performance on the football field, Santa Monica's head coach, Robert Taylor, encouraged Smith to not play for riches or fame, but to play so that he might earn a scholarship to a Division-I school, where he could receive a better education. He also advised Smith and Johnson to not do touchdown celebrations and as Smith said, "they put the cuffs on us." Smith took Taylor's advice to heart, and excelled in his academics, not missing a single day of classes while attending Santa Monica.

After completing two years at Santa Monica College, Smith transferred to the University of Utah, where he established himself as a standout wideout for the Utah Utes football team in the Mountain West Conference where he was a teammate of future NFL running back Mike Anderson. While at the University of Utah, Smith set a record for yards per catch with a 20.6 average, and was chosen to play for the conference's all-star team twice.  In his first season on the team, he ranked 4th in the NCAA in both punt return yards (495) and yard per return (17.1). However, he missed their bowl game in his final season due to injury. After the Blue–Gray All-Star game on December 25, 2000, Smith began to receive attention from various NFL scouts. He was named offensive MVP of the January 13, 2001, East–West Shrine Game.  Smith finished his time at Utah with 78 receptions for 1,608 yards and 12 touchdowns, with another 1,365 return yards and 4 touchdowns on special teams.

He and his wife have endowed an athletics scholarship at the University of Utah.

Professional career

Carolina Panthers

2001 season
The Carolina Panthers chose Smith in the third round (74th overall) during the 2001 NFL Draft.

Smith spent a majority of his rookie season as a kick and punt returner, leading all rookies in net yardage with 1,994 yards, and landing in fourth place among all NFL players behind Priest Holmes, Marshall Faulk, and Derrick Mason. In his first play as a professional, Smith returned the opening kickoff of the first game of the season for a touchdown. Smith also had 10 catches for 154 yards, and rushed 4 times for 43 yards.

However, the team finished 1-15, winning only their season opener against the Minnesota Vikings.

2002 season
During the 2002 NFL season, Smith earned a starting position as a wide receiver and continued as the team's kick returner and punt returner.  Smith finished the 2002 season with 54 receptions for 872 yards and 3 touchdowns.

2003 season and Super Bowl XXXVIII
During the 2003 season, Smith played a critical role for the Panthers offense and helped lead them to their first NFC title in franchise history. He finished the regular season with 88 receptions for 1,110 yards and 7 touchdowns. He eclipsed the 1,000 receiving yards mark for the first time in his career in 2003. During the NFC divisional playoffs, Smith caught a 69-yard pass and ran it for a touchdown in the 2nd overtime period to defeat the St. Louis Rams 29–23. He finished that game with 6 catches, 163 yards, and the one TD. In Super Bowl XXXVIII, he caught 4 passes for 80 yards and a touchdown, and returned a kickoff for 30 yards in the Panthers' 32–29 loss to the New England Patriots.

2004 season and injury
Smith suffered a severe break in his leg during the 2004 NFL season opener against the Green Bay Packers, and was out for the remainder of the year. Before the injury, he managed to record 6 catches for 60 yards, and even attempted a pass which fell incomplete.

2005 season and comeback
In the 2005 NFL season, Smith recovered from his injury to have the best season of his career. He earned the "Triple Crown" of receiving, leading the NFL in receptions (103), receiving yards (1,563), and receiving touchdowns (12) and became only the third player, Jerry Rice (1990) and Sterling Sharpe (1992), to accomplish this feat in the Super Bowl era. Smith also returned 27 punts for 286 yards. His 10.6 yards/punt return was the second-highest of his career, after his 10.7 yards/punt return in his rookie season.

Smith dominated the first two rounds of the 2005–06 NFL playoffs. In a Wild Card Round victory over the New York Giants, Smith caught 10 passes for 84 yards and a touchdown, and rushed for 12 yards and another score. The Panthers then defeated the Chicago Bears in the divisional round, aided by Smith's franchise record 12 receptions for 218 yards and 2 touchdowns. Smith and the Panthers then faced the Seattle Seahawks in the NFC Championship. Although he scored on a 59-yard punt return, Smith was held to 33 receiving yards on 5 catches, and the Panthers lost by a score of 34–14.

Smith, along with teammates Jake Delhomme, Julius Peppers, and Mike Wahle were invited to the 2006 Pro Bowl after the season. Smith also shared the 2005 NFL Comeback Player of the Year Award with New England Patriots' linebacker Tedy Bruschi.

2006 season

After suffering a hamstring injury and developing an ingrown toenail in training camp before the 2006 season, Smith returned to the field after missing two weeks of action. Smith was double covered frequently but still managed to battle through that and injuries to finish the year with 83 catches for 1,186 yards and 8 touchdowns. He was also invited to the 2007 Pro Bowl, his second Pro Bowl in a row and third overall. His contract ran up after the season. On March 1, he signed an extension.

2007 season
By May 4, he signed a new extension worth $45 million for six years. Smith started 15 games for the Panthers during their 2007 season, and led Carolina with 87 catches, 1,002 receiving yards, and 7 touchdowns despite playing with four different starting quarterbacks due to injury to starting quarterback Jake Delhomme.

2008 season
Smith made headlines during the 2008 training camp when he was involved in an altercation with teammate Ken Lucas on August 1, 2008. Smith broke Lucas's nose during the fight and was later sent home for the remainder of the day after reportedly apologizing. Smith was given a two-game suspension by the team. Smith then suffered a severe concussion during the 2008 preseason opener against the Indianapolis Colts, where Smith was hit in the head when catching a pass. He continued to play that game, but did not travel with the team to their next game against the Philadelphia Eagles. After returning from suspension and scoring his first touchdown of the 2008 season, Smith presented the ball to Lucas on the sideline. Despite his 2-game suspension, Smith was voted to play in the 2009 Pro Bowl after he managed to catch 78 passes for 1,421 receiving yards and 6 touchdowns, leading the NFL in receiving yards per game.

2009 season
During Week 16 of the 2009 NFL Season, Smith broke his left forearm on a touchdown catch in a game against the New York Giants causing him to sit out the final game of the year. Smith finished the year with 982 yards on 65 receptions and 7 touchdowns, just 18 yards shy of a fifth consecutive 1,000 yard receiving season. On January 1, 2010, Smith was placed on injured reserve following the injury, and on June 19, 2010, Smith broke his arm again while playing flag football.

2010 season
2010 was Smith's worst season as a starter since 2002. Although he led the team in both receptions and receiving yards, he only managed 46 catches for 554 yards. In addition, he only caught two touchdown passes, 1 fewer than rookie David Gettis. Smith's low numbers were due to the total lack of team offense behind rookie quarterback Jimmy Clausen. The Panthers finished last in most offensive categories and with a 2–14 record, which was the worst in the 2010 season, securing the 1st overall pick in the 2011 NFL Draft. Smith's dissatisfaction led to widespread rumors amongst the Panthers fan base that the star receiver wanted to be traded from the team for the 2011 season.

2011 season
Smith opened up the 2011 season strong, gaining 178 yards and 2 touchdowns on 8 catches, including a 77-yard reception for a touchdown. Smith followed his week 1 performance with another 150-yard receiving game, but had a fumble during the game as well. On November 27, 2011, Smith surpassed the 1,000-yard receiving mark. During Week 14, he became the 35th player in NFL history to reach the 10,000-yard receiving mark after a 125-yard performance against the Atlanta Falcons. Smith reached a total of 1,394 yards on 79 catches, and was one catch away from reaching the 700 rec mark. Smith was selected to his fifth Pro Bowl.

2012 season
Prior to the season, he signed a three-year extension worth $18 million. Smith played in all 16 games in 2012, recording 73 receptions for 1,174 yards and four touchdowns.

2013 season

In 2013, Smith continued to play well, despite hauling in only 64 receptions, his lowest since 2010. On December 22, 2013, Smith received a PCL sprain against the New Orleans Saints. The Panthers came out on top of the Saints 17-13. Smith received his 800th reception in the 2013 season.

Smith was released by the Panthers on March 13, 2014.

Baltimore Ravens

2014 season
Prior to signing with the Ravens, Smith stated that if he happens to meet his former team, the Panthers, again, to "put your goggles on cause there's going to be blood and guts everywhere." On March 14, 2014, Smith signed a three-year contract with the Baltimore Ravens, worth $11.5 million with a $3.5 million bonus. In the Ravens' season opener against the Cincinnati Bengals, Smith caught 7 passes for 118 yards and an 80-yard touchdown, but the Ravens lost the game 23–16. In Week 3 against the Cleveland Browns, Smith caught 5 passes for 101 yards, including a 32-yard reception that set up the game-winning field goal, as the Ravens won 23–21.

In Week 4, Smith faced his old team. On the Ravens' second possession of the game, quarterback Joe Flacco threw a pass which was tipped by Owen Daniels and landed in the arms of Smith, who took the ball to the end zone for a 61-yard touchdown. Later in the game, Flacco fumbled a snap. He picked up the ball and threw a pass to a covered Smith, who caught it in the back of the endzone, despite being held by cornerback Melvin White. Smith finished the game with 7 catches for 139 yards and two touchdowns as the Ravens defeated the Panthers 38–10.

In Week 6, Smith caught a 56-yard touchdown pass in a game in which Flacco threw a career-high five touchdown passes and set the record for the fastest time to throw them (16:03). Smith finished the game with five catches for 110 yards and that 56-yard score. In Week 15, Smith caught his 900th career reception against the Jacksonville Jaguars, as the Ravens won 20–12. In Week 17, Smith reached the single-season 1,000-yard mark for the eighth time in his career. In that game, the Ravens defeated the Cleveland Browns 20–10 and clinched a playoff berth.

Smith finished the 2014 regular season with 79 receptions, 1,065 yards and 6 touchdowns. He also fumbled twice and lost one. In the wild card round of the playoffs, Smith caught five passes for 101 yards as the Ravens defeated the division rival Pittsburgh Steelers for the first time ever in the playoffs. In the divisional round of the playoffs, Smith caught three passes for 44 yards and a touchdown, as the Ravens lost and had their season ended by the eventual Super Bowl XLIX champion New England Patriots.

2015 season
During a press conference on August 10, 2015, Smith announced the upcoming season would be his last.

During the Ravens' third preseason game, against the Redskins, Smith was ejected along with cornerback Chris Culliver. Smith's son went to Twitter, saying, "1st time I've ever gotten to watch a game with my dad. Thanks @NFL". The Ravens' Twitter account tweeted that Smith was ejected for a skirmish, and his son responded to it by saying, "Actually got ejected for ballin too hard". Smith was named starting punt returner after Week 1; at 36, he was and is among the oldest punt returners in league history. In the Ravens' first win against the Pittsburgh Steelers in Week 4, he was forced to leave the game in third quarter due to a lower back injury he suffered after a hit from linebacker Lawrence Timmons. Two days later, it was announced that Smith broke four of his ribs in the Week 4 game.

In a Week 8 game against the San Diego Chargers, Smith tore his achilles tendon, and it was announced he would be out for the rest of the 2015 season. He ended the season having played seven games, racking up 46 catches for 670 yards and three touchdowns.

On December 30, 2015, Smith announced that he would be returning to the Ravens for the 2016 season.

2016 season
Smith had another solid year with the Ravens, he caught 70 passes for 799 yards and 5 touchdowns. In Week 4, he had his only 100+ yard game of the season against Oakland, where he had eight receptions for 111 yards and a touchdown. In the game, Smith finally passed Andre Johnson to become the NFL's active leader in receiving yards. Smith also reached the 1,000 reception mark, the 14th player to reach this milestone. On January 2, 2017, Smith officially announced his retirement from the NFL. He retired with 1,031 receptions (then 12th all-time) for 14,731 yards (7th) and 81 touchdowns (tied for 17th with Art Powell).

NFL career statistics

Career accomplishments

 In 2001, Smith was the first rookie to make the Pro Bowl as a special teams player since Tyrone Hughes in 1993.
 In 2003, Smith's 404 postseason receiving yards were the 2nd most ever (behind Jerry Rice's 409 in 1988).
 In 2005, Smith became the first player since Washington Redskins' receiver Art Monk in 1984 to lead the NFL in receptions for a team that ran more often than it passed.
 In 2005, Smith earned the NFL's receiving "triple crown", leading the league in receptions (103), yards (1,563) and touchdowns (12).
 In 2008, Smith became the only player in history to lead the league in receiving yards per game despite being on an offense that was last in pass attempts.
 Smith and Hall of Famer Tim Brown are the only players in NFL history who have at least 1,000 receptions and have scored touchdowns on runs, catches, punt returns and kick returns.
 Smith is one of only three players in history to run back two punts for touchdowns and catch a touchdown pass in the same game.
 Smith led the NFL in receiving yards per game in the 2008 NFL season.
 All-time Panthers leader in receiving yards (12,197), passing Muhsin Muhammad (9,255) in 2011.
 Caught his 1,000th career reception on November 20, 2016, in a game against the Dallas Cowboys.

NFL records
 Highest punt return average in a single game: 51.0 (December 8, 2002, vs Cincinnati Bengals)

Panthers franchise records
's NFL off-season, Steve Smith held at least 72 Panthers records, including:
 Receptions, career (836), season (103 in 2005), game (14 on 2005-11-20 @CHI), playoffs (51), playoff season (27 in 2005), playoff game (12 on 2006-01-15 @CHI)
 Receiving yards, career (12,197), season (1,563 in 2005), game (201 on 2005-10-30 MIN), playoffs (856), playoff season (404 in 2003), game (218 on 2006-01-15 @CHI)
 Yards per reception, career (14.6)
 Receiving touchdowns, career (67), game (3, twice; with Muhsin Muhammad x2), playoffs (8), playoff season (3 in 2003 and 2005), playoff game (2 on 2006-01-15 @CHI; with Kelvin Benjamin)
 Receiving yards per game, career (67.0), season (101.5 in 2008), playoffs (95.1), playoff season (111.7 in 2005)
 Total touchdowns, career (75), playoffs (10), playoff season (5 in 2005), playoff game (2 on 2006-01-08 @NYG and 2006-01-15 @CHI; with three other players)
 Yards from scrimmage: career (12,584), playoffs (901), playoff season (411 in 2003), playoff game (244 on 2006-01-15 @CHI)
 All-Purpose yards: career (16,607), season (1,994 in 2001), game (313 on 2002-12-08 CIN), playoffs (1,015), playoff season (467 in 2003), playoff game (243 on 2006-01-15 @CHI), rookie season (1,994), rookie game (269 on 2001-11-11 @STL)
 Kickoff return yards, game (252 on 2001-11-11 @STL)
 Kickoff return touchdowns, season: 2 (2001; with Michael Bates)
 Punt returns: career (178), season (55 in 2002), game (9 on 2002-09-15 DET), playoff game (3 on 2004-01-03 DAL; with Ted Ginn Jr.)
 Punt return yards: career (1,652), game (153 on 2002-12-08 CIN), playoffs (73), playoff season (58 in 2005), and playoff game (59 on 2006-01-22 @SEA)
 Yards per punt return: game (51.0 on 2002-12-08 CIN), playoffs (10.43), playoff game (4.33 on 2004-01-03 DAL)
 Punt return touchdowns: career (4), season and game (2 on 2002-12-08 CIN), and only Panther with a postseason punt return TD (2006-01-22 @SEA)
 Total return yards: career (4,023), season (1,795 in 2001), game (206 on 2001-10-14 NOR)
 Games with 100+ receiving yards: career (46), season (10 in 2005), playoffs (3)
 Games with 1+ TD scored: career (71), season (12 in 2005), playoffs (8)
 Games with 2+ TD scored: career (11; with DeAngelo Williams), season (5 in 2005; with Muhsin Muhammad and DeAngelo Williams), playoffs (2)
 Games with 3+ TD scored: career (3; with DeAngelo Williams)
 Seasons with 1,000+ receiving yards: 7

Personal life
In May 2008, Smith announced that he purchased a near-50% interest in the Velocity Sports Performance franchise in Charlotte and an equal ownership percentage in any future Charlotte area Velocity centers. In 2014, he applied to the NFL for a jersey nameplate change from 'Smith' to 'Smith Sr.' upon the announcement of his son's impending birth.

Smith is an Evangelical Christian. In 2007, Smith went on an evangelism trip to Togo and Nigeria to talk to soccer players about Jesus.

Before every away game, Smith Sr. and his family donated shoes to the homeless. He would also wash their feet beforehand. His goal is to hand out half a million pairs of shoes. To provide this service Smith works with Samaritan's Feet. He says, "This is an opportunity for me to give back, to serve....to kind of, really for me, open up the next chapter of my life." Smith planned to take the initiative global after retiring from football.

Smith and his wife, Angie, have four children: Peyton, Baylee, Boston, and Steve Jr.; Smith changed the name on the back of his jersey to Smith Sr. when Steve Jr., nicknamed "Deuce", was born.

On June 14, 2017, it was reported by The Charlotte Observer that he secretly paid the full college tuition of Twitter personality and author Elexus Jionde. He said of paying for her $40,000 a year education at Ohio State: "It's not about taking and how much can you get for yourself. It's about your life and (taking advantage of) all the resources and applying them and then paying it forward to someone else."

In 2019, Smith played for the "Home" roster during the NBA All-Star Celebrity Game at the Bojangles' Coliseum in Charlotte, North Carolina. The roster was made up of celebrities with Carolina roots.

On July 9, 2019, the Panthers announced that Smith would be inducted into the team's Hall of Honor along with Jake Delhomme, Jordan Gross, and Wesley Walls.

See also

List of National Football League annual receptions leaders
List of National Football League annual receiving touchdowns leaders
List of National Football League annual receiving yards leaders
List of National Football League career all-purpose yards leaders
List of National Football League career receptions leaders
List of National Football League career receiving yards leaders
List of National Football League career receiving touchdowns leaders

References

Footnotes

External links

Baltimore Ravens bio
Carolina Panther bio
 

1979 births
Living people
African-American players of American football
American Protestants
African-American Christians
American football return specialists
American football wide receivers
Baltimore Ravens players
Carolina Panthers players
National Conference Pro Bowl players
Players of American football from Los Angeles
Santa Monica Corsairs football players
University High School (Los Angeles) alumni
Utah Utes football players
21st-century African-American sportspeople
20th-century African-American sportspeople
10,000 receiving yards club
Ed Block Courage Award recipients